Lambda Sigma Upsilon Latino Fraternity, Inc. ("L-S-U" or "Upsilons") is an intercollegiate Latino oriented Greek lettered fraternity, founded on April 5, 1979 at Rutgers University–New Brunswick.

Lambda Sigma Upsilon has 81 undergraduate chapters and 6 alumni chapters in universities and cities across the United States. The fraternity is a member of the North American Interfraternity Conference (NIC) and a member of the National Association of Latino Fraternal Organizations (NALFO).

Formation
During the period of the mid to late 1970s protests and acts of civil disobedience became commonplace as students asserted their disappointment with Rutgers University, professors' tenure, national issues, and Latino student rights. The protest became so fervent they began closing down institutions, buildings, and sporting events.

In the spring of 1979, a group of students suggested the creation of a Latino social fellowship. After meeting on a regular basis, they officially established the Lambda Sigma Upsilon Latino Social Fellowship on April 5, 1979. The official motto of the fellowship was "Latinos Siempre Unidos" (Latinos Always United), thus the acronym "LSU". They have been touted as being a "catalyst for change, and a vehicle for pertinent conversation regarding relevant issues between student and the university administration".

Goals
The 20 founders of LSU were men who believed that underrepresented groups, particularly ethnic minorities, at colleges and universities were not getting the attention or services needed to advance their academic successes.  They created Lambda Sigma Upsilon to act as a support group for these groups, as well as to provide a family away from home. The founders developed four Goals that would embody the purpose of Lambda Sigma Upsilon. These goals are:

 Academic excellence
 Cultural awareness and diversity
 Being role models to the community
 Brotherhood

Affiliations

Lambda Sigma Upsilon Latino Fraternity, Inc. is a Member of the National Greek council North American Interfraternity Conference (NIC) and the National Association of Latino Fraternal Organizations (NALFO)

National Chapters

Philanthropy

After the passing of one of their founding fathers, Alberto Rivera, in June 1989 due to HIV/AIDS complications, Lambda Sigma Upsilon Latino Fraternity, Inc. selected HIV/AIDS research and awareness as its primary philanthropy.

The Latinos Siempre Unidos Foundation

The Latinos Siempre Unidos Foundation is a 501 c(3) non-profit foundation. It operates separately and independently of the fraternity. The purpose of the Foundation is to provide scholarships to Latinos, as well as other minorities, enrolled in high school or college who have shown a commitment to leadership and education. The Latinos Siempre Unidos foundation also endows surrounding neighborhoods and communities with new prospects to further learning by supporting fiscally and physically organizations, groups, clubs, associations, and companies who show values in line with those of The Latinos Siempre Unidos Foundation.

See also
List of Latino Greek-letter organizations
List of social fraternities and sororities
Mu Sigma Upsilon
National Association of Latino Fraternal Organizations

References

External links
 

 
Latino fraternities and sororities
International student societies
Hispanic and Latino American organizations
National Association of Latino Fraternal Organizations
North American Interfraternity Conference
Student organizations established in 1979
Rutgers University
Student societies in the United States
1979 establishments in New Jersey